Bachhrawan is a constituency of the Uttar Pradesh Legislative Assembly covering the city of Bachhrawan in the Rae Bareli district of Uttar Pradesh, India. Bachhrawan is one of five assembly constituencies in the Lok Sabha constituency of Rae Bareli. Since 2008, this assembly constituency is numbered 177 amongst 403 constituencies.

Election results

2022

2017
Bharatiya Janta Party candidate Ram Naresh Rawat won in 2017 Uttar Pradesh Legislative Elections defeating Indian National Congress candidate Shahab Sharan by a margin of 22,309 votes.

References

External links
 

Assembly constituencies of Uttar Pradesh
Raebareli district